Rules and Regulations may refer to:

Rules and Regulations (album) by Roll Deep, 2007, and its title track
"Rules and Regulations", a 1986 EP by We've Got a Fuzzbox and We're Gonna Use It
"Rules and Regulations" (song), by Rufus Wainwright, 2007
"Rules And Regulations", a song by Public Image Limited from the 1987 album Happy? (Public Image Ltd album)

See also

Rule (disambiguation)
Regulation (disambiguation)